Pacific State may refer to:

 "Pacific State", an episode of the anime series Eureka Seven
 "Pacific State" (song), a song by British electronic music group 808 State
 One of the five Pacific States of the United States